Academic Press (AP) is an academic book publisher founded in 1941. It was acquired by Harcourt, Brace & World in 1969. Reed Elsevier bought Harcourt in 2000, and Academic Press is now an imprint of Elsevier.

Academic Press publishes reference books, serials and online products in the subject areas of:
 Communications engineering
 Economics
 Environmental science
 Finance
 Food science and nutrition
 Geophysics
 Life sciences
 Mathematics and statistics
 Neuroscience
 Physical sciences
 Psychology

Well-known products include the Methods in Enzymology series and encyclopedias such as The International Encyclopedia of Public Health and the Encyclopedia of Neuroscience.

See also
 Akademische Verlagsgesellschaft (AVG) — the German predecessor, founded in 1906 by Leo Jolowicz (1868–1940), the father of Walter Jolowicz and father-in-law of Kurt Jacoby

References

Further reading

External links 
 

Academic publishing companies
Publishing companies of the United States
Book publishing companies of the United Kingdom
Book publishing companies based in Massachusetts
Elsevier imprints
Publishing companies established in 1941